Lana Petranović (born 4 January 2000) is a Croatian pair skater. With her skating partner, Antonio Souza-Kordeiru, she has competed in the final segment at four European Championships.

Skating career

Early years 
Petranović began learning to skate in 2007. As a singles skater, she appeared at one ISU Junior Grand Prix event, in October 2014. She last competed in singles in January 2015, at the European Youth Olympic Winter Festival in Dornbirn, Austria.

Petranović decided to switch to pair skating and formed a partnership with Michael Lueck. The pair trained in the United States. They made their international debut in September 2015, at the Lombardia Trophy in Italy, and competed at six other competitions, including three ISU Challenger Series events, before parting ways. Their final competition together was the Hellmut Seibt Memorial in February 2016.

Petranović traveled to Moscow to find a new partner. She teamed up with Russia's Antonio Souza-Kordeiru in spring 2016.

2016–2017 season 
Making their international debut as a team, Petranović/Souza-Kordeiru placed fourth at the 2016 CS Warsaw Cup in November. They finished fifth at the 2016 CS Golden Spin of Zagreb in December; 15th at the 2017 European Championships in January in Ostrava, Czech Republic; and 21st at the 2017 World Championships in March in Helsinki, Finland. They were coached by Yuri Larionov in Moscow.

2017–2018 season 
Petranović underwent an operation after injuring the meniscus in her knee and returned to the ice after three months. Due to her injury, the pair was unable to compete in September at the 2017 CS Nebelhorn Trophy, which served as the final qualification opportunity for the 2018 Winter Olympics. They returned to competition in January, placing 12th at the 2018 European Championships in Moscow. In March, they placed 21st at the 2018 World Championships in Milan, Italy. They were coached by Larionov and Dmitri Savin in Moscow.

2018–2019 season 
Coached by Savin in Moscow, Petranović/Souza-Kordeiru placed 7th at their first event of the season, the 2018 CS Lombardia Trophy. They competed at two other Challenger events of the season, the 2018 CS Nebelhorn Trophy and 2018 CS Golden Spin of Zagreb, placing eighth and seventh.  They finished the season placing eighth at the 2019 European Championships and sixteenth at the 2019 World Championships.

2019–2020 season 
Petranović/Souza-Kordeiru placed twelfth at the 2019 CS Golden Spin of Zagreb and fifteenth at the 2020 European Championships.  The 2020 World Championships were cancelled as a result of the COVID-19 pandemic.

2020–2021 season 
Petranović/Souza-Kordeiru placed twenty-first at the 2021 World Championships.

2021–2022 season 
Petranović/Souza-Kordeiru began the season at the 2021 CS Nebelhorn Trophy, seeking to qualify a berth at the 2022 Winter Olympics. They placed twelfth, outside of qualification. They went on to finish sixth at the Budapest Trophy and eleventh at the 2021 CS Golden Spin of Zagreb, and then sixteenth at the 2022 European Championships.

In February, Souza-Kordeiru announced his retirement from competitive figure skating, ending their partnership.

Programs

With Souza-Kordeiru

With Lueck

Ladies' singles

Competitive highlights 
CS: Challenger Series; JGP: Junior Grand Prix

Pairs with Souza-Kordeiru

Pairs with Lueck

Ladies' singles

References

External links 

 

2000 births
Croatian figure skaters
Living people
Sportspeople from Zagreb